Alan E. Gelfand (born April 17, 1945) is an American statistician, and is currently the James B. Duke Professor of Statistics and Decision Sciences at Duke University.  Gelfand’s research includes substantial contributions to the fields of Bayesian statistics, spatial statistics and hierarchical modeling.

Early life and education 
Alan E. Gelfand was born in Bronx, NY.  After graduating from the public school system at the young age of 16, Gelfand attended the City College of New York (now the City University of New York; CUNY) as an undergraduate where he excelled in mathematics.  Gelfand’s matriculation to graduate school symbolized both a physical and educational transition as he moved cross-country to attend Stanford University and pursue a Ph.D. in Statistics.  He finished his dissertation in 1969 on seriation methods (chronological sequencing) under the direction of Herbert Solomon.

Career 
Gelfand accepted an offer from the University of Connecticut where he spent 33 years as a professor.  In 2002, he moved to Duke University as the James B. Duke Professor of Statistics and Decision Sciences.

Gelfand and Smith (1990) 
After attending a short course taught by Adrian Smith at Bowling Green State University, Gelfand decided to take a sabbatical to Nottingham, UK with the intention of working on using numerical methods to solve empirical Bayes problems. After studying Tanner and Wong (1987) and being hinted as to its connection to Geman and Geman (1984) by David Clayton, Gelfand was able to realize the computational value of replacing expensive numerical techniques with Monte Carlo sampling-based methods in Bayesian inference.  Published as Gelfand and Smith (1990), Gelfand described how the Gibbs sampler can be used for Bayesian inference in a computationally efficient manner.  Since its publication, the general methods described in Gelfand and Smith (1990) has revolutionized data analysis allowing previously intractable problems to now be tractable.  To date, the paper has been cited over 7500 times.

Contributions to spatial statistics 
In 1994, Gelfand was presented with a dataset that he had previously not encountered: scallop catches on the Atlantic Ocean.  Intrigued by the challenges associated with analyzing data with structured spatial correlation, Gelfand, along with colleagues Sudipto Banerjee and Brad Carlin, created an inferential paradigm for analyzing spatial data.  Gelfand’s contributions to spatial statistics include spatially-varying coefficient models, linear models of coregionalization for multivariate spatial processes, predictive processes for analysis of large spatial data and non-parametric approaches to the analysis of spatial data.  Gelfand's research in spatial statistics spans application areas of ecology, disease and the environment.

Awards and recognitions 

 Elected Fellow of the American Statistical Association, May 1978 
 Elected Member of the International Statistical Institute, 1986 
 Elected Member of the Connecticut Academy of Arts and Sciences, April 1995 
 Elected Fellow of the Institute of Mathematical Statistics, August 1996 
 Mosteller Statistician of the Year Award, February 2001 
 Tenth Most Cited Mathematical Scientist in the World 1991-2001 
 Science Watch President, International Society for Bayesian Analysis, 2006 
 Recipient, Parzen Prize, 2006
 Distinguished Research Medal, ASA Section on Statistics and the Environment, 2013
 Elected Fellow, International Society for Bayesian Analysis, November 2015

Selected Publications (in Reverse Chronological Order) 
 Banerjee, S., Carlin, B. P., & Gelfand, A. E. (2014). Hierarchical modeling and analysis for spatial data. CRC Press.
 
 
 Gelfand, A. E., Diggle, P., Guttorp, P., & Fuentes, M. (Eds.). (2010). Handbook of spatial statistics. CRC press.
 
 
 
 
 
 Gelfand, A. E., & Dey, D. K. (1994). Bayesian model choice: asymptotics and exact calculations. Journal of the Royal Statistical Society. Series B (Methodological), 501-514.

References

Living people
Duke University faculty
American statisticians
Place of birth missing (living people)
Fellows of the American Statistical Association
People from the Bronx
1945 births
Spatial statisticians
University of Connecticut faculty
City University of New York alumni
Stanford University alumni
Computational statisticians